The 2021 North American and Caribbean Senior Club Championship  was the second edition of the North American and Caribbean Senior Club Championship which is a qualifying tournament for the 2021 IHF Men's Super Globe. It was held in Fremont, United States at the Centerville Junior High School from 25 to 27 August 2021.

Venue
The championship was played in Fremont, at the Ray Gehrke Court.

Teams

Following teams were already qualified for the tournament. The invitation letter was written only a month before the competition.

Referees

Results

''All times are local (UTC-7).

Statistics

Team

Top Scorers 

Source:

References

External links
Official website
Website of USA Team Handball

2021
North American and Caribbean Senior Club Championship
North American and Caribbean Senior Club Championship
International handball competitions hosted by the United States
North American and Caribbean Senior Club Championship